Philip Florig (born 11 September 2003) is a German tennis player.

Florig has a career high ATP singles ranking of 1482 achieved on 18 April 2022. He also has a career high ATP doubles ranking of 1865 achieved on 25 April 2022.

Florig made his ATP main draw debut at the 2022 BMW Open after entering the doubles main draw as alternates with Maximilian Homberg, losing in the first round to Roman Jebavý and Andrés Molteni. Florig is based out of the national sports center in Oberhaching, Germany.

References

External links

2003 births
Living people
German male tennis players
People from Aschaffenburg
Sportspeople from Lower Franconia
Tennis people from Bavaria